Hindley railway station is a railway station that serves the town of Hindley in Greater Manchester, England. It is on the Manchester to Southport line line, west of where the route branches to use either the Atherton line or the Eastern Branch line via Westhoughton, Lostock and Bolton.

History
This station was opened on 20 November 1848 and was originally named Hindley. It was renamed Hindley North on 1 July 1950 to differentiate it from Hindley South station on the line from Wigan Central to Glazebrook. Hindley South closed in November 1964, and Hindley North was renamed Hindley on 6 May 1968. There were also stations serving Hindley at Platt Bridge and at Hindley Green (both closed in 1961) on the line from Wigan North Western to Manchester Exchange, the residual "fast local" and express passenger service ceasing on 1 January 1968.

At Hindley there are now two platforms in use, with the overgrown remains of two further platforms (for the fast lines taken out of use on 21 November 1965.)

Facilities
The car park has been enlarged but passenger numbers have increased so that it is probably in need of further enlargement.  The station is staffed on a part-time basis, with the booking office open from the start of service until early afternoon. Outside these hours, tickets must be bought in advance or on the train.  The station is not accessible for disabled travellers (as both platforms can only be accessed via stairs or stepped ramps) and has passenger information screens on each platform, along with an automated public address system to offer train running details.

Friends of Hindley Station

There is now a "Friends of Hindley Station" group, formed in 2007, whose aim is to promote the use of the station by improvements. The group have had several weekend clearing sessions. During one such session a large nameplaque made of stones on the station banking was uncovered. The results objectively can be considered spectacular, evidenced by the number of "in bloom" and landscaping awards won.  Also, partially as a result of their input, there was a direct link to Manchester Airport from December 2008.  This ended at the May 2018 timetable change and intending travellers now have to change at Manchester Piccadilly or Salford Crescent to reach the airport.

Services 

There are three trains per hour to Manchester Victoria during Monday to Saturday daytimes (with extra calls at peak periods) - two via Atherton and one via Bolton (serving most local stations south of there). Most Leeds-bound trains run through without calling.

During the evenings there are two services to Manchester (one on each route) and to Wigan, of which one extends to Southport (there are no services to Kirkby after 19:00). From December 2019, most services to Wigan will run via or terminate at Wallgate, with just a few early morning and evening trains to North Western. Services to/from Southport will run predominantly via Bolton, save for a small number of peak and late evening workings via Atherton.

On Sundays there are two trains each hour to Manchester Victoria via Atherton and two trains per hour to Wigan (hourly beyond to Southport). Weekend services via Bolton were suspended and replaced by buses due to the ongoing (and seriously delayed) work to electrify the Manchester to Preston Line until the end of 2018, but have now resumed. These operate to Wigan N.W and Victoria once per hour.

Electrification 
In December 2013 it was announced that the line was to be electrified by 2017. A September 2016 update moved the completion date with GRIP Stage 3 being completed by then. On 1 September 2021, it was formally announced the project was proceeding. This means overhead wires will soon going through the station.

References

External links 

	

Railway stations in the Metropolitan Borough of Wigan
DfT Category E stations
Former Lancashire and Yorkshire Railway stations
Northern franchise railway stations
Railway stations in Great Britain opened in 1848